The Armenian Khachkar is a khachkar and monument dedicated to the victims of genocide, installed outside the Colorado State Capitol, in Denver. The memorial was dedicated in 2015. It was defaced in May 2020 as part of the George Floyd protests.

References

2015 establishments in Colorado
Monuments and memorials in Colorado
Outdoor sculptures in Denver
Armenian genocide memorials
Vandalized works of art in Colorado